Tellurium is a chemical element with the symbol Te and atomic number 52. It is a brittle, mildly toxic, rare, silver-white metalloid. Tellurium is chemically related to selenium and sulfur, all three of which are chalcogens. It is occasionally found in native form as elemental crystals. Tellurium is far more common in the Universe as a whole than on Earth. Its extreme rarity in the Earth's crust, comparable to that of platinum, is due partly to its formation of a volatile hydride that caused tellurium to be lost to space as a gas during the hot nebular formation of Earth.

Tellurium-bearing compounds were first discovered in 1782 in a gold mine in Kleinschlatten, Transylvania (now Zlatna, Romania) by Austrian mineralogist Franz-Joseph Müller von Reichenstein, although it was Martin Heinrich Klaproth who named the new element in 1798 after the Latin  'earth'. Gold telluride minerals are the most notable natural gold compounds. However, they are not a commercially significant source of tellurium itself, which is normally extracted as a by-product of copper and lead production.

Commercially, the primary use of tellurium is CdTe solar panels and thermoelectric devices. A more traditional application in copper (tellurium copper) and steel alloys, where tellurium improves machinability also consumes a considerable portion of tellurium production. Tellurium is considered a technology-critical element.

Tellurium has no biological function, although fungi can use it in place of sulfur and selenium in amino acids such as tellurocysteine and telluromethionine. In humans, tellurium is partly metabolized into dimethyl telluride, (CH3)2Te, a gas with a garlic-like odor exhaled in the breath of victims of tellurium exposure or poisoning.

Characteristics

Physical properties
Tellurium has two allotropes, crystalline and amorphous. When crystalline, tellurium is silvery-white with a metallic luster. The crystals are trigonal and chiral (space group 152 or 154 depending on the chirality), like the gray form of selenium. It is a brittle and easily pulverized metalloid. Amorphous tellurium is a black-brown powder prepared by precipitating it from a solution of tellurous acid or telluric acid (Te(OH)6). Tellurium is a semiconductor that shows a greater electrical conductivity in certain directions depending on atomic alignment; the conductivity increases slightly when exposed to light (photoconductivity). When molten, tellurium is corrosive to copper, iron, and stainless steel.

Chemical properties
Crystalline tellurium consists of parallel helical chains of Te atoms, with three atoms per turn. This gray material resists oxidation by air and is not volatile.

Isotopes

Naturally occurring tellurium has eight isotopes. Six of those isotopes, 120Te, 122Te, 123Te, 124Te, 125Te, and 126Te, are stable. The other two, 128Te and 130Te, have been found to be slightly radioactive, with extremely long half-lives, including 2.2 × 1024 years for 128Te. This is the longest known half-life among all radionuclides and is about 160 trillion (1012) times the age of the known universe. 

A further 31 artificial radioisotopes of tellurium are known, with atomic masses ranging from 104 to 142 and with half-lives of 19 days or less. Also, 17 nuclear isomers are known, with half-lives up to 154 days. With the exception of beryllium-8 and beta-delayed alpha emission branches in some lighter nuclides, tellurium (104Te to 109Te) is the lightest element with isotopes known to undergo alpha decay.

The atomic mass of tellurium exceeds that of iodine, the next element in the periodic table.

Occurrence

With an abundance in the Earth's crust comparable to that of platinum (about 1 µg/kg), tellurium is one of the rarest stable solid elements. In comparison, even thulium, the rarest of the stable lanthanides have crustal abundances of 500 µg/kg (see Abundance of the chemical elements).

This rarity of tellurium in the Earth's crust is not a reflection of its cosmic abundance. Tellurium is more abundant than rubidium in the cosmos, though rubidium is 10,000 times more abundant in the Earth's crust. The rarity of tellurium on Earth is thought to be caused by conditions during preaccretional sorting in the solar nebula, when the stable form of certain elements, in the absence of oxygen and water, was controlled by the reductive power of free hydrogen. Under this scenario, certain elements that form volatile hydrides, such as tellurium, were severely depleted through evaporation of these hydrides. Tellurium and selenium are the heavy elements most depleted by this process.

Tellurium is sometimes found in its native (i.e., elemental) form, but is more often found as the tellurides of gold such as calaverite and krennerite (two different polymorphs of AuTe2), petzite, Ag3AuTe2, and sylvanite, AgAuTe4. The town of Telluride, Colorado, was named in hope of a strike of gold telluride (which never materialized, though gold metal ore was found). Gold itself is usually found uncombined, but when found as a chemical compound, it is often combined with tellurium.

Although tellurium is found with gold more often than in uncombined form, it is found even more often combined as tellurides of more common metals (e.g. melonite, NiTe2). Natural tellurite and tellurate minerals also occur, formed by oxidation of tellurides near the Earth's surface. In contrast to selenium, tellurium does not usually replace sulfur in minerals because of the great difference in ion radii. Thus, many common sulfide minerals contain substantial quantities of selenium and only traces of tellurium.

In the gold rush of 1893, miners in Kalgoorlie discarded a pyritic material as they searched for pure gold, and it was used to fill in potholes and build sidewalks. In 1896, that tailing was discovered to be calaverite, a telluride of gold, and it sparked a second gold rush that included mining the streets.

History

Tellurium (Latin tellus meaning "earth") was discovered in the 18th century in a gold ore from the mines in Kleinschlatten (today Zlatna), near today's city of Alba Iulia, Romania. This ore was known as "Faczebajer weißes blättriges Golderz" (white leafy gold ore from Faczebaja, German name of Facebánya, now Fața Băii in Alba County) or antimonalischer Goldkies (antimonic gold pyrite), and according to Anton von Rupprecht, was Spießglaskönig (argent molybdique), containing native antimony. In 1782 Franz-Joseph Müller von Reichenstein, who was then serving as the Austrian chief inspector of mines in Transylvania, concluded that the ore did not contain antimony but was bismuth sulfide. The following year, he reported that this was erroneous and that the ore contained mostly gold and an unknown metal very similar to antimony. After a thorough investigation that lasted three years and included more than fifty tests, Müller determined the specific gravity of the mineral and noted that when heated, the new metal gives off a white smoke with a radish-like odor; that it imparts a red color to sulfuric acid; and that when this solution is diluted with water, it has a black precipitate. Nevertheless, he was not able to identify this metal and gave it the names aurum paradoxum (paradoxical gold) and metallum problematicum (problem metal), because it did not exhibit the properties predicted for antimony.

In 1789, a Hungarian scientist, Pál Kitaibel, discovered the element independently in an ore from Deutsch-Pilsen that had been regarded as argentiferous molybdenite, but later he gave the credit to Müller. In 1798, it was named by Martin Heinrich Klaproth, who had earlier isolated it from the mineral calaverite.

In the early 1920s, Thomas Midgley Jr. found tellurium prevented engine knocking when added to fuel, but ruled it out due to the difficult-to-eradicate smell. Midgley went on to discover and popularize the use of tetraethyl lead.

The 1960s brought an increase in thermoelectric applications for tellurium (as bismuth telluride), and in free-machining steel alloys, which became the dominant use. These applications were overtaken by the growing importance of CdTe in thin-film solar cells in the 2000s.

Production
Most Te (and Se) is obtained from porphyry copper deposits, where it occurs in trace amounts. The element is recovered from anode sludges from the electrolytic refining of blister copper. It is a component of dusts from blast furnace refining of lead.

The anode sludges contain the selenides and tellurides of the noble metals in compounds with the formula M2Se or M2Te (M = Cu, Ag, Au). At temperatures of 500 °C the anode sludges are roasted with sodium carbonate under air. The metal ions are reduced to the metals, while the telluride is converted to sodium tellurite.

Tellurites can be leached from the mixture with water and are normally present as hydrotellurites HTeO3− in solution. Selenites are also formed during this process, but they can be separated by adding sulfuric acid. The hydrotellurites are converted into the insoluble tellurium dioxide while the selenites stay in solution.

The metal is produced from the oxide (reduced) either by electrolysis or by reacting the tellurium dioxide with sulfur dioxide in sulfuric acid.

Commercial-grade tellurium is usually marketed as 200-mesh powder but is also available as slabs, ingots, sticks, or lumps. The year-end price for tellurium in 2000 was US$30 per kilogram. In recent years, the tellurium price was driven up by increased demand and limited supply, reaching as high as US$220 per pound in 2006. The average annual price for 99.99%-pure tellurium increased from $38 per kilogram in 2017 to $74 per kilogram in 2018. Despite the expectation that improved production methods will double production, the United States Department of Energy (DoE) anticipates a supply shortfall of tellurium by 2025. 

In the 2020s, China produced ca. 50% of world's tellurium and was the only country that mined Te as the main target rather than a by-product. This dominance was driven by the rapid expansion of solar cell industry in China. In 2022, the largest Te providers by volume were China (340 tonnes), Russia (80 t), Japan, (70 t), Canada (50 t), Uzbekistan (50 t), Sweden (40) and the United States (no official data).

Compounds

Tellurium belongs to the chalcogen (group 16) family of elements on the periodic table, which also includes oxygen, sulfur, selenium and polonium: Tellurium and selenium compounds are similar. Tellurium exhibits the oxidation states −2, +2, +4 and +6, with +4 being most common.

Tellurides

Reduction of Te metal produces the tellurides and polytellurides, Ten2−. The −2 oxidation state is exhibited in binary compounds with many metals, such as zinc telluride, produced by heating tellurium with zinc.

Halides
The dihalides have not been obtained in pure form, although they are known decomposition products of the tetrahalides in organic solvents, and the derived tetrahalotellurates are well-characterized:

where X is Cl, Br, or I. These anions are square planar in geometry. Polynuclear anionic species also exist, such as the dark brown , and the black .

The square antiprismatic anion  is also attested. The other halogens do not form halides with tellurium in the +6 oxidation state, but only tetrahalides (and ) in the +4 state, and other lower halides (and two forms of ).

Oxocompounds

Since then, however, existence in the solid phase is doubted and in dispute, although it is known as a vapor fragment; the black solid may be merely an equimolar mixture of elemental tellurium and tellurium dioxide.

Tellurium dioxide is formed by heating tellurium in air, where it burns with a blue flame.

The tellurium oxides and hydrated oxides form a series of acids, including tellurous acid, orthotelluric acid and metatelluric acid. The two forms of telluric acid form tellurate salts containing the TeO and TeO anions, respectively. Tellurous acid forms tellurite salts containing the anion TeO.

Zintl cations
When tellurium is treated with concentrated sulfuric acid, the result is a red solution of the Zintl ion, .

Other tellurium Zintl cations include the polymeric  and the blue-black , consisting of two fused 5-membered tellurium rings. The latter cation is formed by the reaction of tellurium with tungsten hexachloride:

Organotellurium compounds

Tellurium does not readily form analogues of alcohols and thiols, with the functional group –TeH, that are called tellurols. The –TeH functional group is also attributed using the prefix tellanyl-. Like H2Te, these species are unstable with respect to loss of hydrogen. Telluraethers (R–Te–R) are more stable, as are telluroxides.

Tritelluride quantum materials

Recently, physicists and materials scientists have been discovering unusual quantum properties associated with layered compounds composed of tellurium that's combined with certain rare-earth elements, as well as yttrium (Y).

These novel materials have the general formula of R Te3, where "R " represents a rare-earth lanthanide (or Y), with the full family consisting of R = Y, La, Ce, Pr, Nd, Sm, Gd, Tb, Dy, Ho, Er & Tm (not yet observed are compounds containing Pm, Eu, Yb & Lu). These materials have a two-dimensional character within an orthorhombic crystal structure, with slabs of R Te separated by sheets of pure Te.

It's thought that this 2-D layered structure is what leads to a number of interesting quantum features, such as charge-density waves, high carrier mobility, superconductivity under specific conditions, and other peculiar properties whose natures are only now emerging.

For example, in 2022, a small group of physicists at Boston College in Massachusetts led an international team that used optical methods to demonstrate a novel axial mode of a Higgs-like particle in R Te3 compounds that incorporate either of two rare-earth elements (R = La, Gd). This long-hypothesized, axial, Higgs-like particle also shows magnetic properties and may serve as a candidate for dark matter.

Applications
In 2022, the major applications of tellurium were thin-film solar cells (40%), thermoelectrics (30%), metallurgy (15%), and rubber (5%), with the first two applications experiencing a rapid increase owing to the worldwide tendency of reducing dependence on the fossil fuel. In metallurgy, tellurium is added to iron, stainless steel, copper, and lead alloys. It improves the machinability of copper without reducing its high electrical conductivity. It increases resistance to vibration and fatigue of lead and stabilizes various carbides and in malleable iron.

Heterogeneous catalysis
Tellurium oxides are components of commercial oxidation catalysts.  Te-containing catalysts are used for the ammoxidation route to acrylonitrile (CH2=CH–C≡N):

Related catalysts are used in the production of tetramethylene glycol:

Niche

Synthetic rubber vulcanized with tellurium shows mechanical and thermal properties that in some ways are superior to sulfur-vulcanized materials.
 Tellurium compounds are specialized pigments for ceramics.
 Selenides and tellurides greatly increase the optical refraction of glass widely used in glass optical fibers for telecommunications.
 Mixtures of selenium and tellurium are used with barium peroxide as an oxidizer in the delay powder of electric blasting caps.
 Neutron bombardment of tellurium is the most common way to produce iodine-131. This in turn is used to treat some thyroid conditions, and as a tracer compound in hydraulic fracturing, among other applications.

Semiconductor and electronic 

Cadmium telluride (CdTe) solar panels exhibit some of the greatest efficiencies for solar cell electric power generators.

In 2018, China installed thin-film solar panels with a total power output of 175 GW, more than any other country in the world; most of those panels were made of CdTe. In June 2022, China set goals of generating 25% of energy consumption and installing 1.2 billion kilowatts of capacity for wind and solar power by 2030. This proposal will increase the demand for tellurium and its production worldwide, especially in China, where the annual volumes of Te refining increased from 280 tonnes in 2017 to 340 tonnes in 2022.

 is an efficient material for detecting X-rays. It is being used in the NASA space-based X-ray telescope NuSTAR.

Mercury cadmium telluride is a semiconductor material that is used in thermal imaging devices.

Organotellurium compounds

Organotellurium compounds are mainly of interest in the research context.  Several have been examined such as precursors for metalorganic vapor phase epitaxy growth of II-VI compound semiconductors.  These precursor compounds include dimethyl telluride, diethyl telluride, diisopropyl telluride, diallyl telluride, and methyl allyl telluride. Diisopropyl telluride (DIPTe) is the preferred precursor for low-temperature growth of CdHgTe by MOVPE. The greatest purity metalorganics of both selenium and tellurium are used in these processes. The compounds for semiconductor industry and are prepared by adduct purification.

Tellurium suboxide is used in the media layer of rewritable optical discs, including ReWritable Compact Discs (CD-RW), ReWritable Digital Video Discs (DVD-RW), and ReWritable Blu-ray Discs.

Tellurium is used in the phase change memory chips developed by Intel. Bismuth telluride (Bi2Te3) and lead telluride are working elements of thermoelectric devices. Lead telluride exhibits promise in far-infrared detectors.

Photocathodes 
Tellurium shows up in a number of photocathodes used in solar blind photomultiplier tubes and for high brightness photoinjectors driving modern particle accelerators.  The photocathode Cs-Te, which is predominantly Cs2Te, has a photoemission threshold of 3.5 eV and exhibits the uncommon combination of high quantum efficiency (>10%) and high durability in poor vacuum environments (lasting for months under use in RF electron guns).  This has made it the go to choice for photoemission electron guns used in driving free electron lasers.  In this application, it is usually driven at the wavelength 267 nm which is the third harmonic of commonly used Ti-sapphire lasers.  More Te containing photocathodes have been grown using other alkali metals such as rubidium, Potassium, and Sodium, but they have not found the same popularity that Cs-Te has enjoyed.

Thermoelectric material 
Tellurium itself can be used as a high-performance elemental thermoelectric material. A trigonal Te with the space group of P3121 can transfer into a topological insulator phase, which is suitable for thermoelectric material. Though often not considered as a thermoelectric material alone, polycrystalline tellurium does show great thermoelectric performance with the thermoelectric figure of merit, zT, as high as 1.0, which is even higher than some of other conventional TE materials like SiGe and BiSb.

Telluride, which is a compound form of tellurium, is a more common TE material. Typical and ongoing research includes Bi2Te3, and La3-xTe4, etc. Bi2Te3 is widely used from energy conversion to sensing to cooling due to its great TE properties. The BiTe-based TE material can achieve a conversion efficiency of 8%, an average zT value of 1.05 for p-type and 0.84 for n-type bismuth telluride alloys. Lanthanum telluride can be potentially used in deep space as a thermoelectric generator due to the huge temperature difference in space. The zT value reaches to a maximum of ~1.0 for a La3-xTe4 system with x near 0.2. This composition also allows other chemical substitution which may enhance the TE performance. The addition of Yb, for example, may increase the zT value from 1.0 to 1.2 at 1275K, which is greater than the current SiGe power system.

Biological role
Tellurium has no known biological function, although fungi can incorporate it in place of sulfur and selenium into amino acids such as telluro-cysteine and telluro-methionine. Organisms have shown a highly variable tolerance to tellurium compounds. Many bacteria, such as Pseudomonas aeruginosa and Gayadomonas, take up tellurite and reduce it to elemental tellurium, which accumulates and causes a characteristic and often dramatic darkening of cells. In yeast, this reduction is mediated by the sulfate assimilation pathway. Tellurium accumulation seems to account for a major part of the toxicity effects. Many organisms also metabolize tellurium partly to form dimethyl telluride, although dimethyl ditelluride is also formed by some species. Dimethyl telluride has been observed in hot springs at very low concentrations.

Tellurite agar is used to identify members of the corynebacterium genus, most typically Corynebacterium diphtheriae, the pathogen responsible for diphtheria.

Precautions

Tellurium and tellurium compounds are considered to be mildly toxic and need to be handled with care, although acute poisoning is rare. Tellurium poisoning is particularly difficult to treat as many chelation agents used in the treatment of metal poisoning will increase the toxicity of tellurium. Tellurium is not reported to be carcinogenic.

Humans exposed to as little as 0.01 mg/m3 or less in air exude a foul garlic-like odor known as "tellurium breath".
This is caused by the body converting tellurium from any oxidation state to dimethyl telluride, (CH3)2Te. This is a volatile compound with a pungent garlic-like smell. Even though the metabolic pathways of tellurium are not known, it is generally assumed that they resemble those of the more extensively studied selenium because the final methylated metabolic products of the two elements are similar.

People can be exposed to tellurium in the workplace by inhalation, ingestion, skin contact, and eye contact. The Occupational Safety and Health Administration (OSHA) limits (permissible exposure limit) tellurium exposure in the workplace to 0.1 mg/m3 over an eight-hour workday. The National Institute for Occupational Safety and Health (NIOSH) has set the recommended exposure limit (REL) at 0.1 mg/m3 over an eight-hour workday. In concentrations of 25 mg/m3, tellurium is immediately dangerous to life and health.

See also
 The 1862 telluric helix of Alexandre-Émile Béguyer de Chancourtois.

References

Cited sources

External links

 USGS Mineral Information on Selenium and Tellurium
 Tellurium at The Periodic Table of Videos (University of Nottingham)
 CDC – NIOSH Pocket Guide to Chemical Hazards – Tellurium

 
Chemical elements
Chalcogens
Metalloids
Trigonal minerals
Minerals in space group 152 or 154
Native element minerals
Chemical elements with trigonal structure
Crystals in space group 152 or 154